Ponta Leste (also: Ponta Calheta) is the easternmost point of the island of São Nicolau, Cape Verde. It is 8 km east of Carriçal and 30 km east of Ribeira Brava. The point was mentioned in a map in a 1747 atlas collection by Jacques-Nicolas Bellin as "Oost-Hoek" (Dutch), "Pointe de l'Est" (French"). It was sometimes known as East Point in English.

Lighthouse
There is a lighthouse on the headland, focal height 73 metres, range .

See also
		
List of lighthouses in Cape Verde

References

Headlands of Cape Verde
Geography of São Nicolau, Cape Verde
Ribeira Brava, Cape Verde